The Bosche Range is a mountain range of the Canadian Rockies located northwest of Highway 16 near the eastern border of Jasper National Park, Canada.

This range includes the following mountains and peaks:

References

Mountain ranges of Alberta
Ranges of the Canadian Rockies